Arturo Longton may refer to:
 Arturo Longton (politician)
 Arturo Longton (television personality)